Robert Burwell Fulton (December 22, 1910 – February 18, 2015) was a rear admiral in the United States Navy. He graduated from the United States Naval Academy in 1932. RADM Fulton was a survivor of the sinking of USS Houston in 1942 and was subsequently a prisoner-of-war of the Japanese.

References

1910 births
2015 deaths
United States Navy rear admirals
United States Naval Academy alumni
American centenarians
Men centenarians
Burials at Arlington National Cemetery
United States Navy personnel of World War II